The county of Oxfordshire
is divided into 6 parliamentary constituencies
— 1 borough constituency
and 5 county constituencies.

Constituencies

2010 boundary changes 
Under the Fifth Periodic Review of Westminster constituencies, the Boundary Commission for England decided to retain Oxfordshire's 6 constituencies for the 2010 election, making minor changes to realign constituency boundaries with the boundaries of current local government wards, and to reduce the electoral disparity between constituencies, including the transfer of Oxford city centre from Oxford West and Abingdon to Oxford East.

Proposed boundary changes 
See 2023 Periodic Review of Westminster constituencies for further details.

Following the abandonment of the Sixth Periodic Review (the 2018 review), the Boundary Commission for England formally launched the 2023 Review on 5 January 2021. Initial proposals were published on 8 June 2021 and, following two periods of public consultation, revised proposals were published on 8 November 2022. Final proposals will be published by 1 July 2023.

The commission has proposed that an additional seat is created in Oxfordshire, with the formation of the new constituency of Bicester and Woodstock. Wantage would be renamed Didcot and Wantage.

The following constituencies are proposed:

Containing electoral wards from Cherwell

 Banbury (part)
 Bicester and Woodstock (part)

Containing electoral wards from Oxford

 Oxford East
 Oxford West and Abingdon (part)

Containing electoral wards from South Oxfordshire

 Henley
 Didcot and Wantage (part)

Containing electoral wards from Vale of White Horse

 Didcot and Wantage (part)
 Oxford West and Abingdon (part)
 Witney (part)

Containing electoral wards from West Oxfordshire

 Banbury (part)
 Bicester and Woodstock (part)
 Witney (part)

Results history
Primary data source: House of Commons research briefing - General election results from 1918 to 2019

2019 
The number of votes cast for each political party who fielded candidates in constituencies comprising Oxforshire in the 2019 general election were as follows:

Percentage votes 
Note that before 1983 Oxfordshire covered a smaller area than it does today, since the Vale of White Horse area was counted as part of Berkshire.

1pre-1979: Liberal Party; 1983 & 1987 - SDP-Liberal Alliance

* Included in Other

Accurate vote percentages are not possible for the elections of 1918 and 1931 since at least one candidate stood unopposed.

Seats 

11983 & 1987 - SDP-Liberal Alliance

Maps

Historical representation by party
A cell marked → (with a different colour background to the preceding cell) indicates that the previous MP continued to sit under a new party name.

1885 to 1918

1918 to 1983

Since 1983

See also
 List of parliamentary constituencies in the South East (region)
History of parliamentary constituencies and boundaries in Oxfordshire

Notes

References

 
Oxfordshire
 
Parliamentary constituencies